Soumitra Sekhar Dey;  is a leading Bengali linguist, educationist, and writer from Bangladesh. Currently he is serving as the 6th vice chancellor of Jatiya Kabi Kazi Nazrul Islam University.

Early life and education
Soumitra was born in Sherpur, Mymensingh Bangladesh. He earned a BA & MA degree in Bengali from the Jahangirnagar University. He also obtained a PhD in Bengali from the Rabindra Bharati University in 1997.

Professional life
He started his teaching career on Chittagong University in 1996. Then the next year he joined as a lecturer in Dhaka University. He worked as a Nazrul Research Center in there.

He is a very popular writer and Bengali language and education columnist.

Publications
 GoddhoShilpi Mir Mosharraf (গদ্যশিল্পী মীর মশাররফ) 
 Nazrul Kobitar Pathved O Onanno Prosongo (নজরুল কবিতার পাঠভেদ ও অন্যান্য প্রসঙ্গ)
 Bangla Vasha O Sahittya Jiggasha (বাংলা ভাষা ও সাহিত্য জিজ্ঞাসা) 
 Civil Society & Onanno Probondho (সিভিল সোসাইটি ও অন্যান্য প্রবন্ধ)
 Bekoron Sondha (ব্যাকরণ সন্ধান)
 Kothashilpo Onneshon (কথাশিল্প অন্বেষণ)
 Satyen Sen er Uponnashe Jibon O Shilper Mithoskriya (সত্যেন সেনের উপন্যাসে জীবন ও শিল্পের মিথস্ক্রিয়া)
 Shater Kobita Shorobiddh Kobikul (ষাটের কবিতাঃ ভালোবাসার শরবিদ্ধ কবিকূল)
 Vashar Pran Vashar Bitorko (ভাষার প্রাণ ভাষার বিতর্ক)
 Sorkari Kormokomison O Shikkhavbna (সরকারি কর্মকমিশন ও শিক্ষাভাবনা)
 Dhaka Bisshobiddyaloy Chetonar Batighor (ঢাকা বিশ্ববিদ্যালয়ঃ চেতনার বাতিঘর)
 Nazrul Antodhormiyo Sompriti O Shilper Bodh(নজরুলঃ আন্তঃধর্মীয় সম্প্রীতি এবং শিল্পের বোধ)
 Moslem Bharat (মোসলেম ভারতঃ বিষয় বিশ্লেষণ)
 Shikkhar Dhara Porikkhar Kara (শিক্ষার ধারা পরীক্ষার কারা)

Awards and honours
 Dhaka University Arts Dean's Award - 2001
 Mayenuddin Foundation Award - 2008
 Nazrul Padak - 2014
 D. Litt. Degree - 2022

References

Vice-Chancellors of universities in Bangladesh
Academic staff of the University of Dhaka
Bangladeshi Hindus